The 1989 William & Mary Tribe football team represented the College of William & Mary as an independent during the 1989 NCAA Division I-AA football season. Led by Jimmye Laycock in his tenth year as head coach, William & Mary finished the season with a record of 8–3–1 and ranked No. 10 in the final NCAA Division I-AA Football Committee poll. The Tribe qualified for the NCAA Division I-AA playoffs, losing to Furman in the first round.

Schedule

References

William and Mary
William & Mary Tribe football seasons
William and Mary Indians football